The 1991–92 season saw Hibernian compete in the Scottish Premier Division, in which they finished 5th. They also competed in the Scottish Cup and Scottish League Cup. They were knocked out in the fifth round of the Scottish Cup, but won the Scottish League Cup, defeating Dunfermline Athletic 2–0 in the final.

Scottish Premier Division

Final League table

Scottish League Cup

Scottish Cup

See also
List of Hibernian F.C. seasons

References

External links
Hibernian 1991/1992 results and fixtures, Soccerbase

Hibernian F.C. seasons
Hibernian